Loyalty Day is observed on May 1 in the United States.  It is a day set aside "for the reaffirmation of loyalty to the United States and for the recognition of the heritage of American freedom". The date, May 1, was set in order to counter International Worker's Day, and was conceived in the height of the Second Red Scare.

History 
The holiday was first observed in 1921, during the First Red Scare. It was originally called "Americanization Day," and it was intended to replace the May 1 ("May Day") celebration of the International Workers' Day, which commemorates the 1886 Haymarket affair in Chicago.

During the Second Red Scare, it was recognized by the U.S. Congress on April 27, 1955, and made an official reoccurring holiday on July 18, 1958 (Public Law 85-529). President Dwight D. Eisenhower proclaimed May 1, 1955, the first observance of Loyalty Day. In 1958, Eisenhower urged Congress to move Child Health Day to the First Monday in October, to avoid conflicting with Loyalty Day.  Loyalty Day has been recognized with an official proclamation every year by every president since its inception as a legal holiday in 1958.

Loyalty Day events, mostly parades, are still held in:

Golden Shores, Arizona
Calhan, Colorado
New Lenox, Illinois 
Brazil, Indiana 
Murray, Kentucky (not annually)
Standish, Michigan
Norfolk, Nebraska
Newport, Oregon
Brandon, South Dakota
El Paso, Texas
Rutland, Vermont 
Long Beach, Washington
Freedom, Wisconsin

Statutory definition 

Loyalty Day is defined as follows in :

(a) Designation.— May 1 is Loyalty Day. 
(b) Purpose.— Loyalty Day is a special day for the reaffirmation of loyalty to the United States and for the recognition of the heritage of American freedom. 
(c) Proclamation.— The President is requested to issue a proclamation— 
(1) calling on United States Government officials to display the flag of the United States on all Government buildings on Loyalty Day; and 
(2) inviting the people of the United States to observe Loyalty Day with appropriate ceremonies in schools and other suitable places.

See also
 Holidays of the United States
 Labour Day
 Law Day (United States)

References

External links 

 Image of "Steps to Better Manhood" truck in the Loyalty Day parade, Los Angeles, 1926, Los Angeles Times Photographic Archive (Collection 1429). UCLA Library Special Collections, Charles E. Young Research Library, University of California, Los Angeles. 

Observances in the United States by presidential proclamation
May observances
American culture
Anti-communism in the United States
Recurring events established in 1921